Trachyphloeosoma advena is a species of broad-nosed weevil in the beetle family Curculionidae.

References

Further reading

 
 

Entiminae
Articles created by Qbugbot
Beetles described in 1956